Claire Nadeau (born 1 June 1945) is a French actress.

Theater

Filmography

References

External links

French film actresses
20th-century French actresses
21st-century French actresses
Actresses from Paris
Living people
1945 births